Linda Regan (born 5 November 1949),<ref name="IMDB" /, born Linda Mary Drinkwater, is a British actress and author, who has appeared on television, film, radio and on stage. She is best known for her role as Yellowcoat April in the British holiday camp sitcom Hi-de-Hi!.

Early life
Born in Brixton, London,  Regan is a daughter of bandleader and agent Peter Regan (born Peter Albert Drinkwater) and Phyllis Drinkwater, an Irish nurse; Regan's older sister is the actress and writer Carol Drinkwater. They moved to Rochester, before settling in Bromley when Regan was five. Regan often helped her father while entertaining, such as helping with Punch and Judy and balloon modelling. After leaving school, Regan attended the Worcester Repertory Company.

Career

Regan made her television debut in an episode of the popular ITV sitcom On the Buses in 1970, shortly after, she appeared in the film version of the same name. This was followed by roles in well known programmes such as Doctor at Large, Softly, Softly: Task Force, Special Branch and Dixon of Dock Green. She was also the stunt double for Katy Manning's Jo Grant in the Doctor Who episode "Carnival of Monsters" in 1973. In the mid-1970s, Regan appeared in several sex comedy films including Carry On England, Confessions of a Pop Performer and Adventures of a Private Eye. She also starred in the high profile films A Private Enterprise (1974), The Hiding Place (1975) and Quadrophenia (1979) and had a main role in the hospital drama General Hospital from 1976 to 1977. Regan appeared in the first episode of popular drama series Minder in 1979 starring George Cole and Dennis Waterman and played a Swedish pop star in Bergerac, before having a role in the film The Hit (1984) with John Hurt and Terence Stamp. She followed this with a main role in the holiday camp sitcom Hi-de-Hi! as April, a character she would play from 1984 until the show's end in 1988, appearing in a total of twenty-four episodes. 

After appearances in Birds of a Feather, thriller Framed and hard hitting crime drama The Knock, Regan starred in five episodes of The Bill before appearing as Harry's mother in all 4 series of children's drama series Harry and Cosh from 1999 to 2003. She continues her career on both stage and screen, including Holby City, Doctors and Run for Your Wife, as well as appearing in several short films and commercials, and writing award winning crime novels.

Personal life
Regan married the actor Brian Murphy in 1995. 

She is dyslexic and was not encouraged at school but wrote stories from a young age. Just before her first book was published, in 2005, she was kidnapped at knifepoint and forced into a car, later jumping from the vehicle to escape. Soon after, she was diagnosed with cancer, which she believes was caused by her kidnap ordeal; she overcame the disease.

A dog lover since childhood, Regan runs her own blog in which she communicates with other dog owners.

Filmography

Film

Television

Writing
 Behind You!. (2006 or 2007). Creme de La Crime. . .
 Dead Like Her. (5 February 2007). Creme de La Crime. . .
 Passion Killers. (2008). Creme de La Crime. . .
 Brotherhood of Blades. (28 July 2011). Creme de La Crime. . .
 Street Girls. (28 March 2012). Creme De La Crime.
 Guts for Garters. (March 2015). Accent Press.
 SisterHoods. (December 2016). Accent Press.
 The Terror Within. (December 2019).  Accent Press.

References

External links

Linda Regan Online
Canines in Kent

Living people
20th-century English actresses
21st-century English actresses
English film actresses
English television actresses
1949 births
Actors with dyslexia
Writers with dyslexia